Kummatty is a 1979 Malayalam film written and directed by G. Aravindan. Ramunni, Master Ashok and Vilasini Reema form the cast.

Cast
Ambalappuzha Ravunni
Ashok Unnikrishnan
Kottara Gopalakrishnan Nair
Kuttyedathi Vilasini

Soundtrack
The music was composed by M. G. Radhakrishnan and Kavalam Narayana Panicker and the lyrics were written by Kavalam Narayana Panicker.

Awards
 Kerala State Film Award for Best Children's Film
 Kerala Film Critics Association Award for Best Children's Film

Legacy
In 2012, filmmaker Ashim Ahluwalia included the film in his personal top ten (for The Sight & Sound Top 50 Greatest Films of All Time poll), writing: "G. Aravindan – the most interesting Indian filmmaker ever. Sadly none of his work is in distribution." The film was screened in the classics section at the 2022 IFFK.

2021 Restoration
On 19 July 2021 The Film Foundation's World Cinema Project, a program created by filmmaker Martin Scorsese in 2007, the Film Heritage Foundation and Italy-based Cineteca di Bologna collaborated to restore the film which had lost its rich color palette over the years with Scorsese notably saying: "Aravindan was a visionary director and Kummatty is considered among his greatest work. The Film Foundation’s World Cinema Project will share this film with the wider audience it deserves, making it a true cinematic discovery."
The film was restored at the L’Immagine Ritrovata lab in Bologna, Italy, and had its world restoration premiere at the Il Cinema Ritrovato festival later that month.

References

External links
 
 
 

1970s Malayalam-language films
Films directed by G. Aravindan